The Mercury is a daily newspaper, published in Hobart, Tasmania, Australia, by Davies Brothers Pty Ltd (DBL), a subsidiary of News Corp Australia, itself a subsidiary of News Corp. The weekend issues of the paper are called Mercury on Saturday  and Sunday Tasmanian. The current editor of The Mercury is Craig Warhurst.

History
The newspaper was started on 5 July 1854 by George Auber Jones and John Davies. Two months subsequently (13 September 1854) John Davies became the sole owner. It was then published twice weekly and known as the Hobarton Mercury. It rapidly expanded, absorbing its rivals, and became a daily newspaper in 1858 under the lengthy title The Hobart Town Daily Mercury. In 1860 the masthead was reduced to The Mercury and in 2006 it was further shortened to simply Mercury.

With the imminent demise of the (Launceston) Daily Telegraph, The Mercury, from March 1928, used the opportunity to increase their penetration there by expanding the branch office in the northern city, and by putting on "fast cars" to get the paper to Launceston by breakfast.

After Davies' retirement in 1871, the business was carried on by his sons John George Davies and Charles Ellis Davies who later traded as Davies Brothers Ltd. John Davies died on 11 June 1872, aged 58. The company remained in the family's hands until 1986 when the Herald and Weekly Times (HWT) assumed majority ownership. In 1988 News Limited (now News Corp Australia), a subsidiary of News Corporation acquired the HWT, and then the remaining minority interests.  However, the subsidiary that owns the Tasmanian operation is still known as Davies Brothers Pty Limited.

The Saturday Evening Mercury, known locally as the 'SEM' was printed and circulated for readers on a Saturday evening from 1954 to 1984, it was replaced in early 1984 by the Sunday Tasmanian which still exists today. Other Tasmanian titles published by the company were the weekly rural newspaper Tasmanian Country and the weekly regional newspaper Derwent Valley Gazette which were acquired from independent publishers in the early 1980s. Both were sold to public relations firm Font PR in 2020. From 1987-2007 Davies Brothers published the monthly travel magazine Treasure Islander.

At various stages in its history there have been limited experiments with regional papers—such as The Westerner which succeeded The West Coast Miner in 1979 to serve the West Coast until its demise in 1995—as well as suburban newspapers for the Hobart market, which appeared in various guises from 1966 until 1998. In November 2006 the company launched what it called a "newspaper in a newspaper" the Kingborough Times which appeared monthly within the Sunday Tasmanian. This was followed in June 2007 by the Northern Times with news from Hobart's northern suburbs. Both inserts have since ceased publication.

Editors
The following people were editors of The Mercury:

Press operations
In July 2007 News Corporation approved a new $31 million press centre for Davies Brothers Pty Ltd, publisher of the Mercury and the Sunday Tasmanian, including the installation of the latest colour press.

Davies Brothers opened the new print centre at the Tasmanian Technopark in Dowsing Point, north of Hobart, in 2009. A new KBA Comet four-colour press replaced the 35-year-old Goss Urbanite press that had been housed in the Argyle Street wing of the company's city site. Other operations of the newspaper group continued to be based in the heart of the city at 93 Macquarie Street.

The success of the new centre soon saw the introduction of local printing of interstate titles for local distribution. This includes the national daily The Australian and Melbourne's Herald Sun.

Locations

In November 2011 Davies Brothers chief executive officer Rex Gardner announced that the company would move from its landmark Macquarie St headquarters in August 2012, leasing a new office at 2 Salamanca Square. The move took place over the weekend of 28–29 July 2012, although months of work had taken place in advance.

The company has branch offices in Launceston and Burnie, as well as its print centre at Dowsing Point and its distribution centre at Western Junction near Launceston. Its branch office at New Norfolk closed in December 2010. An office in William St, Queenstown closed in the early 1990s.

It was announced in May 2013 that the original site had been sold to an unidentified buyer including the heritage-listed Ingle Hall, which was built in 1814 and housed the Mercury Print Museum. The Macquarie St and Argyle St frontages of the Mercury building were heritage listed in 2012 Later in 2013, the purchasers were identified as Penny Clive and her husband Bruce Neill. Their intent was to transform it into restaurants, art galleries and a creative industries hub. It is now used for a restaurant and the Detached Artist Archive, a private gallery.

From early 2013, the Mercury's Salamanca Square office hosted the Tasmanian bureaus of The Australian and Sky News. The Mercury's Hobart offices have also hosted the Tasmanian bureau of Australian Associated Press over many decades. In 2018, the University of Tasmania opened its Tasmanian Media School, co-located with the Mercury in its Salamanca Square office.

In February 2022, the Mercury relocated to an internal office on the ground floor of the same Salamanca Square building it had occupied since 2012. A fraction of the space it once occupied on the floor above, it was the first time the company's offices did not have a street frontage. It continues to host the local bureau of Sky News.

Circulation and readership
As of March 2011, the Mercury reported its Monday–Friday circulation as 44,317 with an average readership of 107,000 and its Saturday circulation as 61,020 with readership of 146,000. The Sunday Tasmanian reported circulation of 58,148 with readership of 129,000.

In March 2021, readership modelling from Enhanced Media Metrics Australia (emma™) reported the Mercury's average weekday readership had dropped to 76,000, the Saturday Mercury to 63,000 and the Sunday Tasmanian to 53,000.

The Tasmanian Mail
The Tasmanian Mail was a weekly newspaper published by The Mercury from July 1877 to June 1935.
It employed a separate staff from that which brought out the Mercury, and was intended to cover the whole of the state.
From 7 April 1921 it was published as The Illustrated Tasmanian Mail.

The following people were editors of the Mail:

See also
List of newspapers in Tasmania

Notes

External links
 
 
 
 
 

Newspapers in Hobart, Tasmania
News Corp Australia
Newspapers established in 1854
Davies Brothers Pty Ltd
1854 establishments in Australia
Daily newspapers published in Australia
Newspapers on Trove
Macquarie Street, Hobart